A golf ball retriever is used by golfers in order to retrieve lost or misplaced balls.  They allow one to retrieve balls from water hazards, deep rough or even the occasional sand trap, where they would not otherwise be able to reach them.

Golf ball retrievers use telescopic extensions to extend up to 4.5 metres, enabling balls to be lifted from water using the swivelling cup at the end.
This piece of equipment is invaluable especially if playing on golf courses where water hazards are prevalent. 

Golf equipment